General Steele may refer to:

Clive Steele (1892–1955), Australian Army major general
Frederick Steele (1819–1868), Union Army major general
Harry L. Steele (1874–1938), U.S. Army major general
James Steele (British Army officer) (1894–1975), British Army general
Martin R. Steele (born 1946), U.S. Marine Corps lieutenant general
Orlo K. Steele (born 1932), U.S. Marine Corps major general
Sam Steele (1848–1919), Canadian Army major general
Thomas Montagu Steele (1820–1890), British Army general
William Steele (Australian Army officer) (1895–1966), Australian Army major general
William Steele (Confederate general) (1819–1885), Confederate States Army brigadier general
William B. Steele (born 1929), U.S. Army major general
William M. Steele (fl. 1960s–2000s), U.S. Army lieutenant general

See also
John Miles Steel (1877–1965), Royal Air Force general
General Steel Industries, American steel company founded as General Steel Castings Corporation in 1928